Coxpark is a hamlet in the parish of Calstock, (where the population is included ) Cornwall, England.

References

Hamlets in Cornwall